Thüringische Landeszeitung (TLZ) is a German daily newspaper issued since 24 September 1945. Its name is translated as "the newspaper of the state of Thuringia".

References

Daily newspapers published in Germany